Godor is a top of Cadair Berwyn in north east Wales. It lies as the last summit on a boggy ridge heading south from Cadair Berwyn's summit. The summits of Tomle and Godor North Top are also to be found on the ridge.

The summit is grassy, marked by a small cairn.

References

External links
 www.geograph.co.uk : photos of Cadair Berwyn and surrounding area

Hewitts of Wales
Mountains and hills of Denbighshire
Nuttalls
Mountains and hills of Powys

cy:Cadair Berwyn